The 1949 UCI Road World Championships took place in Copenhagen, Denmark between 20–21 August 1949.

Events Summary

References

 
UCI Road World Championships by year
W
R
International cycle races hosted by Denmark
International sports competitions in Copenhagen
1940s in Copenhagen
UCI Road World Championships